Purple is a French fashion, art and culture magazine founded in 1992.

History
In 1992, Elein Fleiss and Olivier Zahm started the magazine Purple Prose as a reaction against the superficial glamour of the 1980s; much as a part of the global counterculture at the time, inspired by magazines like Interview, Ray Gun, Nova, and Helmut Newton's Illustrated, but with the aesthetics of what usually is referred to as anti-fashion. Based on their personal interests and views; Purple was, and in a sense still is, made much in the same spirit of the fanzine. The magazine became associated with the "realism" of the new fashion photography of the 1990s, with names like Juergen Teller, Terry Richardson, Wolfgang Tillmans, and Mario Sorrenti.

In the introduction of the Purple Anthology, Zahm writes:

In 2004 it  divided into Purple Fashion published by Purple Institute based in Paris and New York, and Purple Journal, published by Les Editions Purple, based in Paris. On February 16 the first installation of Purple Fashions new web site was launched.

The art director of Purple Prose and Purple Fashion was Christophe Brunnquell until 2006, when he was succeeded by M/M Paris.

Offspring publications
Fleiss and Zahm's collaboration has resulted in many side projects:

Purple Prose – published from October 1992 to winter 1998 (13 issues).
Purple Fiction – a literary magazine published between 1995 and 1998 (4 issues).
Purple Fashion – published between 1995 - 1998 (4 issues), and 2004 - (present).
Purple Sexe – a magazine devoted to sexuality, published between winter 1998 and 2001 (8 issues). The magazine was reborn as a one-off appendix for Purple Fashion Fall/Winter 2008/09, dedicated to Italian porn star Rocco Siffredi.
Purple – a fusion of Purple Prose, Fiction, Fashion, and Sexe; published between summer 1998 and 2003 (16 issues).
Purple Books – a publishing house (1998–2001)
Purple Gallery – a Parisian art gallery
Purple Journal – a cultural magazine published 2004 - (present) in a French and an English version.

Since 2004, Purple is divided in two different publications; Purple Fashion magazine (edited by Zahm and published by Purple Institute) and Purple Journal''' (edited by Fleiss and Sébastien Jamain, published by Les Editions Purple).

===Purple Fashion's artist's books===
Since its second issue, each number of Purple Fashion comes with an artist's book:
No.2 – Terry Richardson: TerryNo.3 – Richard Prince: The Hippie drawingsNo.4 – Hedi Slimane: InterzoneNo.5 – Juergen Teller: Ed in Japan 
No.6 – Rita Ackermann: Good morning New YorkNo.7 – Helmut Lang: Selective memory seriesNo.8 – Dash Snow: You can't drink it if it's frozenNo.9 – Christophe Brunnquell: Annees ErotiquesNo.10 – Harmony Korine: PigxtrasNo.11 – Marlene Marino: Cuba 2009No.12 – Ari Marcopoulos: DebrisNo.13 – Aurel Schmidt: PussyNo.14 – Vincent Darre: VincentNo.15 – Thurston Moore: Street MouthNo.16 – Katja Rahlwes: Full MoonNo.17 – Richard Prince: Purple 20 Years, The Richard Prince Purple BookNo.18 – 
No.19 – Ryan McGinley: The Journey is the Destination''

References

External links
Official website of Purple magazine
An extract from the new book Purple Years (Onestar Press) by Jeff Rian
"Orion Giret, Defacement of Public Art as Art" - a defense of vandalising public art, in purpleDIARY.

1992 establishments in France
Visual arts magazines
Biannual magazines published in France
Cultural magazines
English-language magazines
French-language magazines
Fashion magazines
Magazines established in 1992
Magazines published in Paris